Aboulomania is a mental disorder in which the patient displays pathological indecisiveness. It is typically associated with anxiety, stress, depression, and mental anguish, severely affecting one's ability to function socially. Although many people are indecisive at times, it is rarely to the extent of obsession. The part of the brain that is tied to making rational choices, the prefrontal cortex, can hold several pieces of information at any given time. This may quickly overwhelm somebody when trying to make decisions, regardless of the importance of that decision. They may come up with reasons that their decisions will turn out badly, causing them to over-analyze every situation critically in a classic case of paralysis by analysis. Lack of information, valuation difficulty, and outcome uncertainty can become an obsession for those with aboulomania.

Researchers speculate extremely authoritarian or overprotective parenting can lead to the development of aboulomania. They believe the disorder is a result of overinvolvement and intrusive behaviours. The caretakers who have caused this extreme dependency may have rewarded loyalty and punished the child or patient for independence. It is thought the family of the diagnosed might also be neglectful or avoid expressing emotions in order to demonstrate properly defined relational roles in the family.

References

Mania